Calvine High School is a continuation high school located in Sacramento County, California directly next to Elk Grove, California. It is part of the Elk Grove Unified School District.

School history 

Calvine gets its name from the California Vineyard Company, a huge grape growing enterprise of the early 1900s, located east of Bradshaw Road. Calvine Road leads from what is now Highway 99 to the land belonging to the company. Calvine was the outgrowth of two smaller high schools. They were Omochumnes High, with its Miwok Indian name, located near what is now the Education Center, and Pioneer High, which had been at two different locations during its lifespan. On April 25, 1992.

Extra-curricular activities 

Calvine students have participated in many extra curricular activities such as Marsh Madness, which was a youth leadership program. This program helps train Calvine students to mentor elementary school students on all aspects of existing natural resources. Some other activities that Calvine students experience are things like “In a Blink of an Eye” which shows students what can happen when teenagers participate in illegal street racing; which is the loss of one's life. Another activity that students participate in is the trip to the nimbus fish hatchery where students observe the final stages of salmon migration.

Calvine students participate in a rigorous service learning program using nearby areas for environmental studies. Students learn in a non-classroom environment while taking part in community enhancing projects fostering real world learning.

School staff 
The school currently employs eleven teachers.

Goals 

Calvine High School is a credit recovery program for credit deficient students. Students are no longer required to pass the California High School Exit Exam.

References

External links 
 Calvine High School official web site
 Elk Grove City web site

Educational institutions established in 1991
High schools in Sacramento, California
Continuation high schools in California
Public high schools in California
1991 establishments in California